was chief of staff to Takeshi Mori, commander of the First Imperial Guards Division, at the end of World War II.

Mizutani was in his office, listening to Col. Masataka Ida's explanation of a plot to prevent Japan's surrender, when Gen. Mori was killed by the lead conspirator, Maj. Kenji Hatanaka. He then went with Ida to the headquarters of the Eastern District Army to report the murder.

References
Brooks, Lester. Behind Japan's Surrender: The Secret Struggle That Ended an Empire. New York: McGraw-Hill Book Company, 1968.

Japanese military personnel of World War II
1899 births
1949 deaths
People from Mie Prefecture